Francis Seymour may refer to: 

 Francis Seymour, 1st Baron Seymour of Trowbridge (c. 1590–1664)
 Francis Seymour, 5th Duke of Somerset (1658–1678)
 Francis Seymour, of Sherborne, Dorset (1697–1761), Member of Parliament
 Francis Seymour, 5th Marquess of Hertford (1812–1884)
 Sir Francis Seymour, 1st Baronet (1813–1890), British Army officer and courtier
 Lord Francis Seymour (1725–1799), clergyman of the Church of England
 Frank Seymour (1904–1987), Australian rules footballer

See also
 Francis Seymour-Conway, 1st Baron Conway (1679–1732)
 Francis Seymour-Conway, 1st Marquess of Hertford (1718–1794)
 Francis Seymour-Conway, 3rd Marquess of Hertford (1777–1842)
 Francis Ingram-Seymour-Conway, 2nd Marquess of Hertford (1743–1822)
 Frances Seymour (disambiguation)